4570 may refer to:

 .45-70, a rifle cartridge
 4570 Runcorn, an asteroid
 a year in the 5th millennium, which is a period of time